is a Japanese footballer. He currently plays for JEF United Chiba.

Family
He comes from a sports family.  Hiis father Yutaka is a former professional baseball player, notably for Yokohama BayStars.  He is the eldest of three brothers.  His younger brother Yoshiaki currently plays for Albirex Niigata and youngest brother Daisuke plays for Renofa Yamaguchi FC.

Career statistics

Club
Updated 23 October 2022.

1Includes Emperor's Cup.
2Includes J. League Cup.
3Includes AFC Champions League.

International

Honours

Club
Urawa Red Diamonds
AFC Champions League: 2017
J.League Cup: 2016

References

External links

1991 births
Living people
Association football people from Kanagawa Prefecture
Japanese footballers
J1 League players
J2 League players
Tokyo Verdy players
Shimizu S-Pulse players
Urawa Red Diamonds players
Cerezo Osaka players
JEF United Chiba players
Association football forwards